The French Rugby Federation ( (FFR)) is the governing body for rugby union in France. It is responsible for the French national team and the Ligue nationale de rugby that administers the country's professional leagues.

History
It was formed in 1919 and is affiliated to World Rugby, the sport's governing body.

In 1934 the FFR set up the Fédération internationale de rugby amateur, now known as Rugby Europe, in an attempt to organise rugby union outside the authority of World Rugby, then known as the International Rugby Football Board (IRFB). It included the national teams of Italy, French national team, Catalonia, Czechoslovakia, Romania and Germany national team.

Following German occupation, FFR officials closely associated with the Vichy government lobbied to have certain "un-French" sports banned.  Between the end of 1940 and the middle of 1942, one semi-professional and at least six French Amateur Sport Federations were banned and destroyed by the Vichy regime. These actions were independently verified by the French government in 2002.

In 1978 the Federation became a member of the IRFB, which later became the International Rugby Board and is now World Rugby.

Presidents
 Bernard Lapasset (1991–2008)
 Pierre Camou (2008–2016)
 Bernard Laporte (2016–2023)
 Alexandre Martinez (intérim) (2023–present)

See also
 France national rugby union team
 Ligue Nationale de Rugby
 List of rugby union clubs in France

References

External links
 Official site

 
Rugby
Rugby union governing bodies in Europe
World Rugby members
Sports organizations established in 1919
1919 establishments in France